This is a list of burial places of prime ministers of New Zealand.

Seven early prime ministers were buried in England. Of those interred in New Zealand, nine are in Wellington, six in Auckland, two elsewhere in the North Island and seven in the South Island.

Unlike other countries New Zealand does not have allocated funding for the upkeep of prime ministerial burial sites and as a result many have become dilapidated and overgrown.

List

Notes

External links
 

 Burials in New Zealand
New Zealand prime ministers